Leonardo Zamora Legaspi, O.P. (25 November 1935 – 8 August 2014) was the Archbishop of the Roman Catholic Archdiocese of Caceres and president of the Catholic Bishops Conference of the Philippines (1988–1991). He was appointed the first Filipino Rector Magnificus of the University of Santo Tomas in 1970.

On 8 September 2012, Pope Benedict XVI accepted his retirement as Metropolitan Archbishop of Caceres, and named Bishop Rolando Joven Tria Tirona, O.C.D., as Archbishop-elect. Archbishop Tirona, who until then had been the Bishop-Prelate of the Roman Catholic Territorial Prelature of Infanta in the Philippines, immediately succeeded to the see upon the acceptance of his appointment and was formally installed as Metropolitan Archbishop of Caceres on 14 November 2012.

Early life and education
Legaspi was born in Meycauayan, Bulacan on 25 November 1935. After his high School education at St. Mary's Academy in Meycauayan, he went to the University of Hong Kong where he obtained an A.B. degree in Philosophy in 1955.

In 1960, he joined the Dominican Order, and in the following year he received a Licentiate of Sacred Theology (S.T.L.) from the University of Santo Tomas in 1962, and subsequently a S.T.D. degree the same year. After receiving his B.S. degree in Educational Management at the Harvard Graduate School of Business Administration in 1971, he again studied at the University of Santo Tomas and earned his Ph.D. degree in 1975.

Career
In 1968, he served as the first Filipino Rector Magnificus of the University of Santo Tomas's Central Seminary, and in 1970, he was appointed the first Filipino Rector Magnificus of the University of Santo Tomas. On 30 June 1977, he was designated as Titular Bishop of Elefantaria in Mauritania and Auxiliary Bishop of Manila. 

Later, he was installed in Solemn Ceremonies as the 33rd Bishop and 3rd Archbishop of the Caceres at the Metropolitan Cathedral of Saint John the Evangelist, Naga City, on 18 January 1984. In 1987, he openly gave sermons that denounced the violence committed by members of the New People's Army, the armed wing of the Communist Party of the Philippines, and was assigned bodyguards in late December after receiving death threats. He served as the president of the Catholic Bishops Conference of the Philippines (CBCP) from 1988 to 1991 and President of the Second Plenary Council of the Philippines in 1991.

Death
On his 37th episcopal anniversary and Feast of Saint Dominic, 8 August 2014, Legaspi died at age 78 on 5:00 a.m. at the University of Santo Tomas Hospital of lung cancer.

Honors and awards
Ten Outstanding Young Men of the Philippines Award for Education (1974)
Grand Cross, Order of Alfonso X the Wise (1974)
Tanglaw Awards (1974)
Kyung Hee University's Highest (Golden) Award (1974)
Rizal Pro Patria Award (1975)
International Association of University Presidents Award (1976)

Honorary degrees
Doctor of Education Honoris Causa, National University, Manila
Doctor of Laws Honoris Causa, Angeles University, Pampanga
Doctor of Humanities, University of Northeastern Philippines

References

1935 births
2014 deaths
20th-century Roman Catholic archbishops in the Philippines
21st-century Roman Catholic archbishops in the Philippines
Alumni of the University of Hong Kong
Deaths from lung cancer in the Philippines
Dominican bishops
Filipino archbishops
Filipino Dominicans
Harvard Business School alumni
People from Meycauayan
Recipients of the Civil Order of Alfonso X, the Wise
Rector Magnificus of the University of Santo Tomas
Roman Catholic archbishops of Cáceres
Presidents of the Catholic Bishops' Conference of the Philippines
University of Santo Tomas alumni
Academic staff of the University of Santo Tomas